Ben Scrivens (born September 11, 1986) is a Canadian former professional ice hockey goaltender and current team manager of the University of Denver men's team. He has also played in the NHL for the Toronto Maple Leafs, Los Angeles Kings, Edmonton Oilers, and Montreal Canadiens.

Scrivens played four years with the Cornell Big Red of the ECAC. After his senior season, Scrivens was named a first team All-American, ECAC Goaltender of the Year and was one of ten finalists for the Hobey Baker Award. He started his professional career with the Reading Royals of the ECHL, before being called up to join the Toronto Marlies at the end of the 2010–11 AHL season.

Playing career

Junior hockey
Scrivens played in the Alberta Junior Hockey League (AJHL) for two seasons. He broke into the league with the Drayton Valley Thunder during the 2004–05 season, playing a single game with the team before moving on to the Calgary Canucks. During his final year of junior hockey, Scrivens played with the Spruce Grove Saints. He won 27 games, while losing 12 and tying three, finishing the year with a 2.43 goals against average (GAA) and .921 save percentage. He was named the Saints' Most Valuable Player and Player of the Year for the 2005–06 season. Scrivens played in the AJHL All-Star game, and represented Team North at the 2006 Viking Cup, where they won the championship.

Collegiate hockey
Scrivens joined the Cornell Big Red for the 2006–07 season. He played in 12 games, starting eight and recording three wins. He recorded his first collegiate shutout in a 6–0 win against Union College. During his sophomore season at Cornell, Scrivens established himself as the team's starting goaltender, playing in 35 of the team's 36 games. For the week of December 3, 2007, Scrivens was named the ECAC Hockey goaltender of the week. He was an honorable mention All-Ivy League after the season. He won 19 games, and finished with a 2.30 GAA and .911 save percentage. Scrivens retained his starting job with the Big Red during his junior season, and joined the ranks of top NCAA goalies across the country. He played in 36 games with the Big Red, recording 22 wins, a GAA of 1.81 and a .931 save percentage. Scrivens picked up many awards for his playing during the 2008–09 season, including being named the National Player of the Week for the first week of the season, as well as second team All-ECAC and an honorable mention All-Ivy League at the end of the season. He was also tapped as a member of Quill and Dagger at the conclusion of the season.

Scrivens' senior season with the Big Red saw him earn First Team All-American honors, while playing in 34 games and winning 21. He had a 1.87 GAA and a .934 save percentage. Scrivens captured the Ken Dryden Trophy as ECAC goaltender of the year, and was named one of ten finalists for the Hobey Baker Award. He finished his collegiate career with 19 shutouts, fourth all-time in NCAA history.

Professional hockey

Toronto Maple Leafs
After completing his collegiate career, and as an unrestricted free agent, Scrivens signed a one-year contract with the Toronto Maple Leafs on April 28, 2010. Scrivens signed with Toronto largely due to the presence of goaltending coach François Allaire, with whom Scrivens had worked during an off-season goalie camp.

Scrivens started the 2010–11 season with the Reading Royals of the ECHL, the Maple Leafs' second tier affiliate. He played in 13 games with the Royals, winning 10. For his efforts he was selected to represent the Royals in the ECHL All-Star Classic. His strong play at the ECHL level, and injuries to other goalies in the Maple Leafs systems, earned Scrivens two separate callups to the Toronto Marlies of the American Hockey League (AHL), one in November and one in February. Scrivens was one of two goalies on the Marlies Clear Day roster announced on March 8, 2011, meaning he would be spending the remainder of the season at the AHL level, barring injury or suspension.

The Maple Leafs re-signed Scrivens on July 1, 2011. He was called up to the NHL as of October 24, 2011, in an emergency situation. After serving as backup for the previous games, he made his first regular season start on November 3, 2011, in Columbus against the Blue Jackets. In that game, he recorded his first career win and stopped 38 shots in a 4–1 game. As the NHL resumed play after the 2012–13 NHL lockout, Scrivens became a full-time NHL goaltender for the first time, serving as the backup to James Reimer, starting Toronto's first two games. Scrivens recorded his first NHL career shutout February 16, 2013, in a 3–0 victory over the Ottawa Senators.

Los Angeles Kings
Scrivens was traded to the Los Angeles Kings in June 2013 along with Matt Frattin and a second round pick in exchange for goaltender Jonathan Bernier. Scrivens served as the backup goaltender to Jonathan Quick.

On November 12 of the 2013–14 season, Scrivens relieved an injured Quick with 1:20 remaining in overtime against the Buffalo Sabres. Scrivens then started the next three games, posting 23 saves in a 3–2 comeback victory over the New York Islanders on November 14 and recording consecutive shutouts against the New Jersey Devils on November 15 (with 26 saves) and the New York Rangers on November 17 (with 37 saves). Shortly after Quick's return in January, however, Scrivens became expendable due to the play of third goaltender Martin Jones, and he was subsequently traded to the Edmonton Oilers.

Edmonton Oilers

On January 29, 2014, Scrivens set the NHL record for most saves by a goaltender in a regular season shutout, stopping 59 shots from the San Jose Sharks during 60 minutes of regulation time, leading the Oilers to a 3–0 victory. Scrivens also set an Oilers franchise record in the process for most saves in a game, surpassing the previous record of 56 set by Bill Ranford in 1993.

The Oilers re-signed Scrivens to a two-year contract worth $2.3 million per season on March 3, 2014.

Montreal Canadiens
On December 28, 2015, the Montreal Canadiens announced that they had acquired Scrivens from the Edmonton Oilers, in exchange for forward Zack Kassian.

KHL
On July 14, 2016, Scrivens agreed to a one-year contract with HC Dinamo Minsk of the Kontinental Hockey League (KHL) for the 2016–2017 season. He played for Salavat Yulaev Ufa in the 2017–2018 season after which he announced his retirement.

Post retirement 
On September 9, 2018, Scrivens announced he would be managing the University of Denver's men's hockey team as he pursued a master's degree at the school.

International play

Scrivens was invited and accepted to play for Team Canada at the 2014 World Championships. In his international tournament debut, he finished as Canada's starting goaltender in the quarter-final loss to Finland. Canada finished the tournament in fifth place.

Scrivens played for Canada's bronze medal-winning team at the 2018 Winter Olympics. He appeared in three games and recorded a 1.61 GAA before suffering an injury in the quarterfinal game against Finland.

Personal life
Scrivens is from Spruce Grove, Alberta. He is the middle child of Wayne and Dawna Scrivens, with an older brother, Adam, and a younger sister, Bronwyn. While playing hockey at Cornell, Scrivens studied Hotel Administration. He is married to Jenny Scrivens, since June 2012, also a professional goaltender (now retired).

Career statistics

Regular season and playoffs

International

Awards and achievements

Junior hockey

College

AHL

NHL

References

External links

1986 births
Living people
Bakersfield Condors players
Calgary Canucks players
Canadian ice hockey goaltenders
Cornell Big Red men's ice hockey players
HC Dinamo Minsk players
Drayton Valley Thunder players
Edmonton Oilers players
Ice hockey people from Alberta
Los Angeles Kings players
Montreal Canadiens players
Ice hockey players at the 2018 Winter Olympics
Olympic ice hockey players of Canada
Olympic bronze medalists for Canada
Medalists at the 2018 Winter Olympics
Olympic medalists in ice hockey
People from Spruce Grove
St. John's IceCaps players
Salavat Yulaev Ufa players
Spruce Grove Saints players
Toronto Maple Leafs players
Toronto Marlies players
Undrafted National Hockey League players
Canadian expatriate ice hockey players in Belarus
Canadian expatriate ice hockey players in Russia
AHCA Division I men's ice hockey All-Americans